Jacques Théry (1881–1970) was a French novelist, playwright and screenwriter. He worked in Hollywood during the 1940s. His collaborator Charles Brackett considered him to be an "outspoken, hard-line communist".

Selected filmography
 A Precocious Girl (1934)
 Unripe Fruit (1934)
 Farewell Waltz (1934)
 Song of Farewell (1934)
 Gold (1934)
 A Royal Divorce (1938)
 Arise, My Love (1940)
 Rhythm on the River (1940)
 Joan of Paris (1942)
 The Heavenly Body (1944)
 Yolanda and the Thief (1945)
 To Each His Own (1946)

References

Bibliography
 Brackett, Charles. "It's the Pictures That Got Small": Charles Brackett on Billy Wilder and Hollywood's Golden Age. Columbia University Press,  2014.
 Goble, Alan. The Complete Index to Literary Sources in Film. Walter de Gruyter, 1999.

External links

1881 births
1970 deaths
Writers from Paris
French screenwriters
20th-century French screenwriters
French expatriates in the United States